The Toros de Nuevo Laredo (Bulls of Nuevo Laredo in English) are a professional basketball team based in Nuevo Laredo, Tamaulipas, Mexico playing in the Northern Division of the Mexican Liga Nacional de Baloncesto Profesional (LNBP).

History
The Correcaminos UAT Matamoros (Matamoros Roadrunners) were transferred to Nuevo Laredo in 2007 and were renamed Venados de Nuevo Laredo. In the 2009-10 season the team was renamed Toros de Nuevo Laredo. During the 2010–2011 season the Toros de Nuevo Laredo won their first League Championship beating the Pioneros de Quintana Roo.
During the 2012 - 2013 season the team was renamed the Toros de Los Dos Laredos after an agreement with the city of Laredo, Texas to play home games in the Laredo Energy Arena. The Toros de Los Dos Laredos played their home games in the newly designed sports complex, the Ciudad Deportiva's Gimnasio Multidisciplinario Nuevo Laredo in Mexico and the Laredo Energy Arena in the United States. The Toros de Los Dos Laredos won its second championship in 2013 beating Halcones UV Xalapa. It was announced that for the 2013-2014 the team would be renamed back to Toros de Nuevo Laredo. The reason given was that the team is funded by the state and its budget was cut in half because it played half its games out of state.

Sponsorship

Oradel Industrial Center: Since 2017 the industrial park is a sponsor of Toros de Nuevo Laredo.

Roster
Venados de Nuevo Laredo 2012-13 season.

Championships

2010 / 2011 Championship series

2011 / 2012 Championship series

2012 / 2013 Championship series

See also
Liga Nacional de Baloncesto Profesional

References

External links
torosnld.com Toros official site 
Liga Nacional de Baloncesto Profesional

Basketball teams in Mexico
Sports teams in Tamaulipas
Nuevo Laredo
Basketball teams established in 2007
2007 establishments in Mexico